Fern Jones (1923–1996) was an American gospel singer from Arkansas who blended traditional gospel music with elements of country and rockabilly.

Jones got married at 16 to Ray Jones, and with her husband she toured the Southern revival circuit. The only album she ever recorded was Singing a Happy Song, released in 1959 on Dot Records. The album, with additional songs, was released in 2005 as Fern Jones/The Glory Road and music from the album is heard in movies and on television.

Glory Road tracklist

I Am A Pilgrim (2:30)
You Ain't Got Nuthin' (2:40)
I Do Believe (2:05)
I Was There When It Happened (2:06)
Be Thankful You're You (2:26)
Strange Things Happening Every Day (2:26)
I Ain't Got Time (2:14)
Just A Little Talk With Jesus (2:19)
Keeps Me Busy (2:33)
Take My Hand, Precious Lord (2:40)
Let Tomorrow Be (1:59)
Didn't It Rain (2:29)
I Was There When It Happened (Alternate Version) (2:20)
My Prayer For The Ones I Love (2:27)
I Do Believe (Alternate Version) (2:16)
I Don't Know (2:17)
We'll Understand It By And By (2:00)
Whispering Hope (2:00)
Keeps Me Busy (Alternate Version) (2:32)
Let Tomorrow Be (Alternate Version) (2:04)
I Don't Care What The World May Do (2:10)
Just A Closer Walk (2:41)
This World Is Not My Home (1:57)
When A Sinner Prays (2:37)

References

1923 births
1996 deaths
American gospel singers
20th-century American singers